Gil Sharone is an American drummer and member of the rock bands Stolen Babies, Team Sleep, and formerly The Dillinger Escape Plan and Marilyn Manson. He was also a fill in for the punk rock band +44. His twin brother is Rani Sharone, also of Stolen Babies.

Sharone is highly regarded as one of the most versatile touring/session drummers in the world, due to his work on classic-styled ska, Rocksteady and reggae, while also working in punk rock and industrial metal.

Career 
Sharone supported Mark Hoppus's band +44 when Travis Barker broke his arm. Gil toured around Europe, Japan and Australia with +44 in early 2007. It is believed he learned all of +44's setlist on the flight from America to Europe. He played on Travis's OCDP Drum Kit, which is a custom made transparent green. He started using Drum Workshop drums and hardware in October 2011.

Sharone also recorded the drum tracks on the third Dillinger Escape Plan record Ire Works, and joined the band during all of their tour dates in 2008 (he played the European tour in early 2008 both with Dillinger and also as support with Stolen Babies). Gil also performed on Maynard James Keenan's V Is for Vagina album by Puscifer.

In January 2009, it was announced that Sharone had parted ways with Dillinger Escape Plan, due to his focus on Stolen Babies and other personal projects including his DVD, Wicked Beats, based on the drumming styles of Ska, Rocksteady and Reggae.
Wicked Beats will be released through Hudson Music late 2010.

Sharone played Teenage Alex on an episode of Full House along with his twin brother, who played Teenage Nicky.

In November 2013, Sharone began working with Marilyn Manson on a new album. On January 15, 2015, The Pale Emperor was released. Sharone worked on the follow up album, Heaven Upside Down, released October 6, 2017. In March 2019, Sharone announced that he was quitting the band.

Sharone was featured on Reggae Grammy winners Morgan Heritage track "So Amazing" on the album Strictly Roots (2016). You can also hear his work playing on the film scores to "John Wick," "John Wick 2," "Slackers" and the TV shows, "Salem," "Kingdom," and the Netflix series "The Punisher (2017)".

On December 6 and 7, 2019, Sharone joined his former bandmate Greg Puciato and Jerry Cantrell of Alice In Chains for two sold-out concerts in Los Angeles, performing songs from Cantrell's solo career as well as Alice In Chains. These were Cantrell's first solo concerts since 2004.

In 2021, Sharone played drums on Jerry Cantrell's album Brighten.

References

External links 
 Interview on drumchannel.com
 The Official Website of Drummer Gil Sharone

American rock drummers
Living people
The Dillinger Escape Plan members
20th-century American drummers
American male drummers
Team Sleep members
21st-century American drummers
20th-century American male musicians
21st-century American male musicians
+44 (band) members
Marilyn Manson (band) members
Industrial metal musicians
American twins
Year of birth missing (living people)